Si Bun Rueang is a district (amphoe) in the southwestern part of Nong Bua Lamphu province, northeastern Thailand. It may also be spelled Sri Bun Rueang.

History
The area was Ban Non Sung Plueai of Tambon Yang Lo, Nong Bua Lamphu District, Udon Thani province. The government created it to be a minor district (king amphoe) on 16 July 1965, which was upgraded to a full district on 1 March 1969.

Geography
Neighboring districts are (from the north clockwise) Na Wang, Na Klang, Mueang Nong Bua Lamphu, and Non Sang of Nong Bua Lamphu Province, Nong Na Kham and Si Chomphu of Khon Kaen province, Phu Kradueng, Pha Khao, and Erawan of Loei province.

The important water resource is the Phong River.

Administration
The district is divided into 12 sub-districts (tambons), which are further subdivided into 153 villages (mubans). There are two townships (thesaban tambons): Non Sung Plueai covers parts of tambon Mueang Mai, and Chom Thong covers parts of tambon Si Bun Rueang. There are a further 12 tambon administrative organizations (TAO).

References

External links
amphoe.com

Si Bun Rueang